José Romano Gutiérrez-Solana y  Gutiérrez-Solana (28 February 1886, Madrid – 24 June 1945, Madrid) was a Spanish painter, engraver and author. He usually signed his paintings as "J. Solana". Generally, he is considered to be an Expressionist, but his style was heavily influenced by El Greco, the Black Paintings of Goya and the works of Eugenio Lucas Velázquez.

Biography 

His father was born in Mexico and came to Spain after receiving an inheritance from his relatives in Ruesga; marrying a cousin from Arredondo. His first lessons came from his uncle, José Díez Palma, who was a professor of drawing at the University of Salamanca. From 1900 to 1904, he studied at the Escuela de Bellas Artes de San Fernando and, in 1906, received honorable mention at the Exposición Nacional de Bellas Artes.

In 1909, his parents moved to Cantabria, so he divided his time between Santander and Madrid. He also made frequent trips to La Mancha, Aragón and Andalucía, making sketches and notes as he went to the carnivals and visited the cemeteries, hospitals and  bordellos; deriving great inspiration from the mobs at El Rastro, the market in Madrid. Well-supplied with money from his father, he took singing lessons, attended the theater and developed a great passion for the bullfights. At one point, he became an assistant in the cuadrilla (team) of the torero "Bombé".

Eventually, he settled in Madrid in 1917, where he frequented the parks, the Museo del Prado and the National Archaeological Museum. It was during this period that his personal style found full expression.

In 1928, he held his first showing in Paris, which turned out to be a failure. At another exhibition, his paintings were hung behind large doors, so they would not "bother" King  Alfonso XIII when he came for a visit. By 1936, however, at the beginning of the Spanish Civil War, he had achieved fame throughout Europe. At that time, he went to Paris, following a brief stay in Valencia. After the war, he returned to Madrid, where he remained until his death.

In addition to his paintings, he wrote several books; mostly accounts of his travels and descriptions of local customs. In 1926, he wrote a novel: Florencio Cornejo.

Selected writings 
 La España negra, 1920. Reprinted by Forgotten Books, 2015 
 Madrid: escenas y costumbres (2 Vols., 1913 and 1918) Full text of Vol.2 @ Google Books. Reprinted by Trigo Editions 
 Madrid callejero, 1923. Reprinted by Trigo Editions 
 Florencio Cornejo, 1926. Reprinted by Creatica, 2011

References

Further reading 
 Ricardo López Serrano, J. Solana: los personajes en su literatura y su pintura, Universidad de Cantabria, 2004  
 María José Salazar, Andrés Trapiello, José Gutiérrez Solana, Museo Nacional Centro de Arte Reina Sofia, 2004  
 José L. Barrio-Garay, José Gutiérrez Solana: paintings and writings, Bucknell University Press, 1978

External links

ArtNet: More works by Gutiérrez Solana.
Arcadja Auctions: More works by Gutiérrez Solana.

1886 births
1945 deaths
20th-century Spanish painters
20th-century Spanish male artists
Spanish male painters
Spanish Expressionist painters
Artists from Madrid
20th-century travel writers
Spanish travel writers
Spanish novelists
Real Academia de Bellas Artes de San Fernando alumni
Expressionist painters